Kawal Sharma is an Indian film director and producer who works in Hindi films.

Selected filmography
 Heeralal Pannalal (1999) (as director)
 Namak (1996) (as director and producer)
 Gunahon Ka Devta (1990) (as director)
 Mar Mitenge (1988) (as director)
 Jeete Hain Shaan Se (1987) (as director)
 Paap Ki Kamaee (1980) (as director)  Maalamaal

References

External links

1959 births
Hindi film producers
Hindi-language film directors
20th-century Indian film directors
Living people